Major General Sir Iain Charles Mackay-Dick,  (born 24 August 1945) Is a retired British Army officer. He was the Major-General commanding the Household Division and General Officer Commanding London District.

Military career
Educated at St Edmund's School, Hindhead, then at Sherborne School and the Royal Military Academy Sandhurst, Mackay-Dick was commissioned into the Scots Guards in 1965. He was appointed a Member of the Order of the British Empire for his service in Northern Ireland in 1981.

He took part in the Falklands War leading the landing of 600 Scots Guards and others at Fitzroy on East Falkland.

In 1986 he was appointed Commandant of the Junior Division Staff College at Warminster and in 1989 he became Commander of 11th Armoured Brigade. He was made Deputy Military Secretary at the Ministry of Defence in 1991 and General Officer Commanding 1st Armoured Division in 1992. He went on to be Commander of British Forces in the Falkland Islands in 1993 and Major-General Commanding the Household Division and General Officer Commanding London District in 1994. He retired in 1997.

In retirement he became Clerk to the Trustees and Chief Executive of Morden College.

Family
In 1971 he married Carolynn Hilary Homes and they went on to have three daughters.

References

|-
 

1945 births
Living people
People educated at Sherborne School
Graduates of the Royal Military Academy Sandhurst
British Army personnel of the Falklands War
Knights Commander of the Royal Victorian Order
Members of the Order of the British Empire
Scots Guards officers
British Army generals
British military personnel of The Troubles (Northern Ireland)
Deputy Lieutenants of Greater London